Messier 36 or M36, also known as NGC 1960, is an open cluster of stars in the somewhat northern Auriga constellation. It was discovered by Giovanni Batista Hodierna before 1654, who described it as a nebulous patch. The cluster was independently re-discovered by Guillaume Le Gentil in 1749, then Charles Messier observed it in 1764 and added it to his catalogue. It is about 1,330 pc (4,340 light years) away from Earth. The cluster is very similar to the Pleiades cluster (M45), and if as far away it would be of similar apparent magnitude.

Based upon photometry, the age of the cluster has been estimated by Wu et al. (2009) as 25.1 Myr and  Myr by Bell et al. (2013). The luminosity of the stars that have not yet depleted their lithium implies an age of  Myr, in good agreement with these older estimates.

M36 includes ten stars with a visual magnitude brighter than 10, and 178 down to magnitude 14. 38 members display an infrared excess, with one being particularly high. There is one candidate B-type variable star, of 9th magnitude.

Map

See also
 List of Messier objects

References

External links

 

Messier 036
Messier 036
036
Messier 036
Perseus Arm
?